Goat Mountain is located in the Lewis Range, Glacier National Park in the U.S. state of Montana. Goat  Mountain rises above Otokomi Lake and Goat Lake in the east central section of Glacier National Park.

Climate
Based on the Köppen climate classification, it is located in an alpine subarctic climate zone with long, cold, snowy winters, and cool to warm summers. Temperatures can drop below −10 °F with wind chill factors below −30 °F. Precipitation runoff from the mountain drains into Saint Mary Lake, thence the St. Mary River.

Geology

Like other mountains in Glacier National Park, it is composed of sedimentary rock laid down during the Precambrian to Jurassic periods.

See also
 Mountains and mountain ranges of Glacier National Park (U.S.)

References

Goat Mountain
Mountains of Glacier National Park (U.S.)
Lewis Range
Mountains of Montana